Johnny W. Stringer (born February 1, 1950) is an American Democratic politician. He is a former member of the Mississippi House of Representatives from the 87th District, being first elected in 1979 and retiring in 2016.

References

1950 births
Living people
People from Bay Springs, Mississippi
Democratic Party members of the Mississippi House of Representatives